Andrei Vîlcea (2 July 1922 – 1998) was a Romanian foil and sabre fencer. He competed in three events at the 1952 Summer Olympics.

References

External links
 

1922 births
1998 deaths
Romanian male sabre fencers
Romanian male foil fencers
Olympic fencers of Romania
Fencers at the 1952 Summer Olympics